Giovanni Battista Langetti (1625–1676), also known as Giambattista Langetti, was an Italian late-Baroque painter. He was active in his native Genoa, then Rome, and finally for the longest period in Venice.

He first trained with Assereto, then Pietro da Cortona, but afterwards studied under Giovanni Francesco Cassana, appeared in Venice by the 1650s where he worked in a striking Caravaggesque style. He is thought to have influenced Johann Karl Loth and Antonio Zanchi. He painted many historical busts for private patrons in the Venetian territory and in Lombardy. He died at Venice in 1676.

References

(Original from Fogg Library, Digitized May 18, 2007)

1625 births
1676 deaths
17th-century Italian painters
Italian male painters
Painters from Genoa
Painters from Venice
Italian Baroque painters